The World Group was the highest level of Fed Cup competition in 2010. Eight nations competed in a three-round knockout competition. Italy was the defending champion, and they went on to meet their fellow defending finalists the United States in the final. The Italians won for a second consecutive year, 3–1.

Participating Teams

Draw

First round

Italy vs. Ukraine

Czech Republic vs. Germany

Russia vs. Serbia

France vs. United States

Semifinals

Italy vs. Czech Republic

Russia vs. United States

Final

Italy vs. United States

References

See also
Fed Cup structure

World